Magdalena Catherina Swanepoel (7 November 1930 – 2 June 2007) was a South African track and field athlete who competed in the shot put and javelin throw events.

She was born in Hopetown, a town in the north-west part of South Africa in Thembelihle Local Municipality. She spent most of her life in Pretoria. She was a 13-time national champion in throwing events, including eight javelin titles.

Her greatest achievements came at the Commonwealth Games. THis made her South Africa's first women's throws champion at the competition. She also took a bronze in the shot put that year, about a metre down on the winner, New Zealand's Yvette Williams.

Swanepoel returned four years later to defend her title but although she threw close to a career best with  she was a long way short of Australia's Anna Pazera, whose winning throw of  would stand as a record for twenty years.

After retiring from active competition she took up coaching in Pretoria and worked as a lecturer at Normal College Pretoria.

International competitions

References

1930 births
2007 deaths
People from Thembelihle Local Municipality
South African female shot putters
South African female javelin throwers
Female sports coaches
South African sports coaches
Afrikaner people
Commonwealth Games gold medallists for South Africa
Commonwealth Games silver medallists for South Africa
Commonwealth Games bronze medallists for South Africa
Commonwealth Games medallists in athletics
Athletes (track and field) at the 1954 British Empire and Commonwealth Games
Athletes (track and field) at the 1958 British Empire and Commonwealth Games
Medallists at the 1954 British Empire and Commonwealth Games
Medallists at the 1958 British Empire and Commonwealth Games